The 2001 Poe Fire was a destructive wildfire in the U.S. state of California's Butte County. After igniting on September 6, the fire burned  and destroyed at least 133 structures in the Big Bend and Yankee Hill areas north of Oroville before it was fully contained on September 12, 2001. The fire was the most destructive incident of California's 2001 wildfire season.

The fire started when a tree fell on a Pacific Gas & Electric (PG&E) power line, and the incident was the subject of a civil lawsuit by more than 100 plaintiffs that PG&E eventually settled for several million dollars.

Background factors 
On September 6, Butte County was under a red flag warning, a product issued by the National Weather Service for conditions supportive of dangerous wildfire spread.

Fire progression

September 6 
The Poe Fire broke out the morning of September 6, at around 8:20 a.m. PDT, when strong northeast winds felled a -tall ponderosa pine snag, which struck three power lines that provided backup electricity for PG&E's Poe Powerhouse on the North Fork Feather River. The strong winds and multiple resulting spot fires quickly consolidated into a single blaze, which moved up the slope.

Aircraft, including six fixed-wing air tankers and two helicopters, began assisting firefighters by noon. The Yankee Hill area was evacuated near midnight, and though firefighters were able to protect the majority of homes several dozen structures were still lost.

September 7 
On its western edge, the fire jumped Highway 70 near Lunt Road, but firefighters were able to contain the slop-over.

September 8 – 10 
On September 8 the fire remained 20% contained, and the number of firefighters on the incident increased as crews demobilized from the Darby Fire in Calaveras County. By the next afternoon the Poe Fire had reached  and 50% containment, with more than 1,500 firefighters working. The fire primarily moved east, working along the bottoms of the river canyons, and firefighters welcomed improved weather conditions that brought lower temperatures and winds with higher humidity. The last remaining section of uncontained fire was moving east, between Big Bend Road and the Feather River.

September 11 
Aircraft fighting the Poe Fire that day were temporarily prevented from flying because of the ground stop order issued nationwide in response to the deadly September 11 attacks in New York, Washington, D.C., and Pennsylvania. The National Interagency Fire Center (NIFC) eventually instructed firefighting agencies to apply for exemptions through the Federal Aviation Administration (FAA) as needed, and at least one of the aircraft on the Poe Fire was equipped with a special transponder code that broadcast its "friendly" status. The restriction began at about 10:00 a.m. and was in force for about three hours, when the FAA granted Cal Fire's request for exemption. In the meantime, stunned firefighters kept abreast of events, including the deaths of hundreds of their colleagues in New York, via portable televisions and radios as well as a large-screen television brought into base camp.

September 12 
The Poe Fire was declared 100% contained on September 12, though firefighters continued to quench hot spots and used controlled burns to burn off vegetation between the fire itself and its containment lines.

Impacts

Casualties 
The Poe Fire caused no fatalities, but at least 20 firefighters were injured. One firefighter was hospitalized with smoke inhalation and hypertension on September 6.

Closures and evacuations 
In addition to the evacuations of Big Bend and Yankee Hill, the fire forced the closure of a  section of Highway 70 between September 6 and 8.

Damage 
Precise figures for the number of structures destroyed in the Poe Fire vary by source. Cal Fire records report that 133 structures were destroyed and three damaged in the Poe Fire. However, the Chico Enterprise-Record reported that the fire destroyed 170 structures, including 47 homes (as well as 155 vehicles), and a 2018 article from The Mercury News reported that the figure was 192 structures, including 40 homes. The Poe Fire also did about half-a-million dollars in damage to road and highway infrastructure (such as safety devices and signage), including Highway 70. The total losses amounted to more than $6 million, on top of about $5 million in fire suppression costs. At the time, the Poe Fire was the most destructive fire in the history of Butte County.

However, Butte County's request for both gubernatorial and presidential disaster declarations was denied by the office of Governor Gray Davis, on the basis that not enough property damage (or the right kind, such as damage to water flumes or other public entities) had occurred to meet the Federal Emergency Management Agency (FEMA) or state Office of Emergency Services (OES) threshold. The region's representative in Congress Wally Herger urged the governor to declare a disaster, and the Butte County board of supervisors appealed the decision. The Butte County Office of Emergency Services said that they lacked enough money to even remove debris from the fire, and that the fire had destroyed 43 wells and created a water shortage in the "financially distressed" county. Eventually, at the governor's request, the federal Small Business Administration declared Butte County a disaster area, making low-interest federal loans available to victims of the Poe Fire there. Butte County also waived all fees associated with reconstruction from damage from the fire.

Lawsuit 
In April 2002, two local attorneys representing 87 plaintiffs sued PG&E for damages resulting from the Poe Fire, alleging that the company had failed to inspect and maintain the right-of-way for the powerlines and remove the dead Ponderosa pine, violating the California Public Resources Code. Ken Roye, one of the attorneys, had previously extracted two settlements from PG&E over their responsibility for power lines that had started both the 1986 Doe Ridge Mill Fire and the 1990 Campbell Complex.

Attorneys for the plaintiffs—which eventually numbered over a hundred, including Cal Fire and insurance companies—announced a $5.9 million settlement on February 21, 2006, nearly four-and-a-half years after the Poe Fire. The announcement came immediately before the matter had been scheduled to go to trial, with more than 30 planned expert witnesses. PG&E admitted no culpability for the fire through the settlement.

See also 

 Butte Fire (2015)
 Camp Fire (2018)
 Dixie Fire (2021)

References 

Wildfires in Butte County, California
September 2001 events in the United States
2001 in California
2001 wildfires in the United States
2001 California wildfires